Quilt or quilted maple refers to a type of figure in maple wood. It is seen on the tangential plane (flat-sawn) and looks like a wavy "quilted" pattern, often similar to ripples on water. The highest quality quilted figure is found in the Western Big Leaf species of maple. It is a distortion of the grain pattern itself. Prized for its beauty, it is used frequently in the manufacturing of musical instruments, especially guitars.

See also
Flame maple

References

External links

Maple
Wood